Patrick Prendergast may refer to:

 Patrick Prendergast (academic), Provost of Trinity College, Dublin
 Patrick Prendergast (abbot)  (c. 1741–1829), last Abbot of Cong and guardian of the Cross of Cong
 Patrick Eugene Prendergast (1868–1894), assassin of Chicago mayor Carter Harrison Sr.

See also 
 Paddy Prendergast (disambiguation)